Harold Lindsell (December 22, 1913 – January 15, 1998) was an evangelical Christian author and scholar who was one of the founding members of Fuller Theological Seminary. He is best known for his 1976 book The Battle for the Bible.

Lindsell was born in New York City and obtained degrees at Wheaton College, University of California, Berkeley and New York University. He taught at Columbia Bible College (Columbia International University), Northern Baptist Theological Seminary, Fuller Theological Seminary, and Wheaton College before becoming editor of Christianity Today. He served as president of the Evangelical Theological Society in 1971.

Lindsell is credited with boosting the efforts of conservatives to wrest the Southern Baptist Convention away from moderates over the issue of biblical inerrancy. Ruth Graham credited him with "being used by God to save her doubting faith" while she was a student at Wheaton.

Lindsell's contributions to the exegesis of Scripture included preparing and editing the introductions, annotations, topical headings, marginal references, and index to the Harper Study Bible, published by Zondervan Bible Publishers.

Lindsell was diagnosed with polyneuropathy in 1991 and died of flu complications in 1998.

References

1913 births
1998 deaths
American evangelicals
Southern Baptist ministers
Writers from New York City
Wheaton College (Illinois) alumni
University of California, Berkeley alumni
New York University alumni
Fuller Theological Seminary faculty
Editors of Christian publications
Baptists from New York (state)
Christian scholars
20th-century Baptist ministers from the United States